Lenke Lorán (1 May 1927 – 27 August 2017) was a Hungarian actress. She was born in Győr, Hungary. Her career began in 1935.

Lorán played mostly comedies, but she also performed memorably in more serious films as well. Her best known roles were in Nyári játék, Entanglement, and in 7-es csatorna.

Between 1945 and 1966, she was a member of the Theater of the Hungarian People's Army and the Petőfi Theater. Between 1966 and 1998, she played on the Amusement Stage. Between 1998 and 2011, she was a member of the Microscope Stage. She retired in 2014.

Lorán died of heart failure on 27 August 2017 in Budapest, Hungary at the age of 90.

References

External links

 

1927 births
2017 deaths
Hungarian film actresses
Hungarian television actresses
Hungarian stage actresses
Actresses from Budapest
20th-century Hungarian actresses
21st-century Hungarian actresses